The Finnish Figure Skating Championships are a figure skating national championship held annually by the Finnish Figure Skating Association to determine the national champions of Finland (see also: Finnish Champion). Medals may be awarded in the disciplines of singles (men's and ladies’), pair skating, and ice dancing. Not all disciplines have been held in every year due to a lack of participants.

Senior medalists

Men

Ladies

Pairs

Ice dancing

Junior medalists

Men

Ladies

Pairs

Ice dancing

Novice medalists

Men

Ladies

References

External links
 Finnish Figure Skating Association (Suomen Taitoluisteluliitto)
 Result archive (in Finnish)
 Historic Finnish champions
 YLE article on 2007-2008 results 

 
Figure skating national championships
Figure skating in Finland